A Boltzmann sampler is an algorithm intended for random sampling of combinatorial structures. If the object size is viewed as its energy, and the argument of the corresponding generating function is interpreted in terms of the temperature of the physical system, then a Boltzmann sampler returns an object from a classical Boltzmann distribution.

The concept of Boltzmann sampler was proposed by Philippe Duchon, Philippe Flajolet, Guy Louchard and Gilles Schaeffer in 2004.

Description 
The concept of Boltzmann sampling is closely related to the symbolic method in combinatorics.
Let  be a combinatorial class with an ordinary generating function  which has a nonzero radius of convergence , i.e. is complex analytic. Formally speaking, if each object
 is equipped with a non-negative integer size , then the generating function  is defined as

where  denotes the number of objects  of size . The size function is typically used to denote the number of vertices in a tree or in a graph, the number of letters in a word, etc.

A Boltzmann sampler for the class  with a parameter  such that , denoted as
 returns an object  with probability

Construction

Finite sets 

Disjoint union 

 

where  stands for "if the random variable  is 1, then execute , else execute ". More generally, if the disjoint union is taken over a finite set, the resulting Boltzmann sampler can be represented using a random choice with probabilities proportional to the values of the generating functions.

Cartesian product 

Sequence 

 
 

where  stands for "draw a random variable ; if the value  is returned, then execute  independently  times and return the sequence obtained". Here,  stands for the geometric distribution .

Recursive classes 
As the first construction of the sequence operator suggests, Boltzmann samplers can be used recursively. If the target class  is a part of the system

 

where each of the expressions  involves only disjoint union, cartesian product and sequence operator, then the corresponding Boltzmann sampler is well defined. Given the argument value , the numerical values of the generating functions can be obtained by Newton iteration.

Labelled structures 
Boltzmann sampling can be applied to labelled structures. For a labelled combinatorial class , exponential generating function is used instead:

where  denotes the number of labelled objects  of size . The operation of cartesian product and sequence need to be adjusted to take labelling into account, and the principle of construction remains the same.

In the labelled case, the Boltzmann sampler for a labelled class  is required to output an object  with probability

Labelled sets 
In the labelled universe, a class  can be composed of all the finite sets of elements of a class  with order-consistent relabellings. In this case, the exponential generating function of the class  is written as

where  is the exponential generating function of the class . The Boltzmann sampler for  can be described as

 

where  stands for the standard Poisson distribution .

Labelled cycles 
In the cycle construction, a class  is composed of all the finite sequences of elements of a class , where two sequences are considered equivalent if they can be obtained by a cyclic shift. The exponential generating function of the class  is written as

where  is the exponential generating function of the class . The Boltzmann sampler for  can be described as

 

where  describes the log-law distribution .

Properties 
Then, the size has the first and the second moment satisfying

 
 
 .

Examples

Binary trees 
The class  of binary trees can be defined by the recursive specification

and its generating function  satisfies an equation
 and can be evaluated as a solution of the quadratic equation

The resulting Boltzmann sampler can be described recursively by

Set partitions 

Consider various partitions of the set  into several non-empty classes, being disordered between themselves.
Using symbolic method, the class  of set partitions can be expressed as

Therefore, Boltzmann sampler can be described as

where the positive Poisson distribution  is a Poisson distribution with a parameter  conditioned to take only positive values.

Further generalisations 

The original Boltzmann samplers described by Philippe Duchon, Philippe Flajolet, Guy Louchard and Gilles Schaeffer only support basic unlabelled operations of disjoint union, cartesian product and sequence, and two additional operations for labelled classes, namely the set and the cycle construction. Since then, the scope of combinatorial classes for which a Boltzmann sampler can be constructed, has expanded.

Unlabelled structures 
The admissible operations for unlabelled classes include such additional operations as Multiset, Cycle and Powerset. Boltzmann samplers for these operations have been described by Philippe Flajolet, Éric Fusy and Carine Pivoteau.

Differential specifications 
Let  be a labelled combinatorial class. The derivative operation is defined as follows: take a labelled object  and replace an atom with the largest label with a distinguished atom without a label, therefore reducing a size of the resulting object by 1. If  is the exponential generating function of the class , then the exponential generating function of the derivative class is given byA differential specification is a recursive specification of type

 

where the expression  involves only standard operations of union, product, sequence, cycle and set, and does not involve differentiation.

Boltzmann samplers for differential specifications have been constructed by Olivier Bodini, Olivier Roussel and Michèle Soria.

Multi-parametric Boltzmann samplers 
A multi-parametric Boltzmann distribution for multiparametric combinatorial classes is defined similarly to the classical case. Assume that each object  is equipped with the composition size  which is a vector of non-negative integer numbers. Each of the size functions  can reflect one of the parameters of a data structure, such as the number of leaves of certain colour in a tree, the height of the tree, etc.

 returns an object  with probability

Multiparametric Boltzmann samplers have been constructed by Olivier Bodini and Yann Ponty. A polynomial-time algorithm for finding the numerical values of the parameters  given the target parameter expectations, can be obtained by formulating an auxiliary convex optimisation problem

Applications

Software 

Random Discrete Objects Suite (RDOS): http://lipn.fr/rdos/
Combstruct package in Maple: https://www.maplesoft.com/support/help/Maple/view.aspx?path=combstruct
 Haskell package Boltzmann Brain: https://github.com/maciej-bendkowski/boltzmann-brain

References 

Combinatorial algorithms